A correctional emergency response team (abbreviated CERT or CRT) is a team of specially trained prison officers tasked with responding to disturbances, riots, cell extractions, mass searches, and other situations in prisons that are likely to involve uncooperative or violent prisoners.

Duties
Possible duties of a CRT include transport of high risk inmates, extracting uncooperative prisoners from their cells, daily full cell searches and high profile security, barricaded persons, riots, mass arrest, high risk or high profile transport and hostages situations, as well as crowd control. In the United States, CRT organization and training requirements differ from state to state. A standard cell extraction team may consists of the following:

CRT team leader "leads", and is the only person who may give verbal commands to both the inmate and to their own team. Requires spoken communication skills and  anger de-escalation techniques.
The equipment/video member "EQV" captures the entire response on video.
CRT officer "1" is the lead member, first in to deal with the inmate. Usually a shield man.
CRT officer "2" is the second team member in. Usually assigned to immobilize the right arm/hand.
CRT officer "3" is the third team member in. Usually assigned to immobilize the left arm/hand.
CRT officer "4" is the fourth team member in. Usually assigned to immobilize the right leg.
CRT officer "5" is the fifth team member in.  Usually assigned to immobilize the left leg.  (Practiced in the Capital Health Emergency Facility in Trenton, NJ)
CRT officer "6" is the sixth team member in.  Usually assigned to apply restraints (handcuffs, leg irons, flexi-cuffs, etc). (Practiced in the Capital Health Emergency Facility in Trenton, NJ)

CRT officers are outfitted with extensive gear, including body armor, helmets, tactical gloves, handcuffs, leg shackles, and riot shields.
A CRT officer may also be outfitted with a less-than-lethal shotgun, taser, OC spray, or lethal weapons such as firearms.
A CRT officer may be outfitted with plain-clothes police uniforms and work as part of a "strong man team" in emergency rooms (Capital Health Emergency Facility in Trenton, NJ).

France 

The nine Regional Response and Security Teams (Équipes régionales d'intervention et de sécurité (ÉRIS)) - one for interregional directorates of penitentiary services in France - were created in 2003 after the successive mutinies in the central prisons of Moulins-Yzeure and Clairvaux. When the teams were created, they comprised 210 personnel; in 2010, the ÉRIS were made up of around 400 people from the French prison administration. (As of 1994, a regional unit made up of agents from various establishments of Marseille.

Hong Kong CERT

With a size of around 152 part-time personnel, the special response unit of the Correctional Services Department was set under the organisation of the escort and support group.

The Hong Kong CERT handles emergency and riots with Hong Kong's prison system. Members are equipped with less lethal weaponry such as pepper spray. Firearms are used as a last resort.

See also
 Initial Reaction Force
 Singapore Prisons Emergency Action Response

References

Law enforcement in the United States
Penal system in the United States